Diminovula is a genus of sea snails, marine gastropod mollusks in the subfamily Eocypraeinae of the family Ovulidae.

Species
Species within the genus Diminovula include:
Diminovula aboriginea (Cate, 1973)
Diminovula alabaster (Reeve, 1865)
Diminovula aurantiomacula Cate & Azuma in Cate, 1973
 Diminovula bilineata (Bozzetti, 2009)
Diminovula caledonica (Crosse, 1872)
Diminovula concinna (Sowerby in A. Adams & Reeve, 1848)
Diminovula coroniola (Cate, 1973)
Diminovula culmen (Cate, 1973)
Diminovula dautzenbergi (Schilder, 1931)
Diminovula fainzilberi Fehse, 2009
Diminovula incisa Azuma & Cate, 1971
Diminovula kosugei (Cate, 1973)
Diminovula margarita (Sowerby, 1828)
Diminovula mozambiquensis Fehse, 2001
Diminovula nielseni Cate, 1976
 Diminovula punctata (Duclos, 1828)
Diminovula rosadoi Lorenz & Fehse, 2009
 Diminovula sandrae Lorenz & Fehse, 2011
Diminovula stigma (Cate, 1978)
Diminovula whitworthi Cate, 1973
Species brought in synonymy
Diminovula anulata Fehse, 2001: synonym of Margovula anulata (Fehse, 2001)
 Diminovula cavanaghi Iredale, 1931: synonym of Globovula cavanaghi (Iredale, 1931)
 Diminovula sinensis (G. B. Sowerby III, 1874): synonym of Margovula marginata (G. B. Sowerby I, 1828)

References

 Duclos P.L., 1828. Description d'une nouvelle espèce d'Ovule de l'océan éthiopique. Mémoires de la Société d'Histoire Naturelle de Paris (2)4: 248

External links
 Iredale, T. (1930). Queensland molluscan notes, No. 2. Memoirs of the Queensland Museum. 10(1): 73-88, pl. 9
 Cate C.N. (1973). A systematic revision of the recent cypraeid family Ovulidae. The Veliger. 15 (supplement): 1-117.

Ovulidae